Hary is a commune in northern France. Hary or Háry may also refer to
Hary (name)
Cyclone Hary, the strongest tropical cyclone in 2001–02 in South-West Indian Ocean
Háry János, a Hungarian folk opera
Háry János (1941 film), a Hungarian musical film
Háry János (1965 film), a Hungarian musical film